The 2021 Latvian Football Cup was a single elimination association football tournament which began on 27 June 2021. RFS won the cup final 1–0 over Liepāja and earned a place in the first qualifying round of the 2022–23 UEFA Europa Conference League. Liepāja were the defending champions.

Preliminary round
Two preliminary round matches were played on 27 June 2021.

|}

First round
Fourteen first round matches were played on 3–4 July 2021.

|}

Second round
Sixteen second round matches were played on 17–18 July 2021.

|}

Third round
Eight third round matches were played on 31 July and 1 August 2021.

|}

Fourth round
Seven fourth round matches were played on 7–9 August 2021.

|}

Quarter–finals
The quarter–finals were played on 21–22 August 2021.

|}

Semi–finals
The semi–finals were played on 19 September 2021.

|}

Final
The final was played on 24 October 2021.

See also
2021 Latvian Higher League

References

External links 
 LFF.lv
 uefa.com

Latvian Football Cup seasons
Latvian Football Cup
2021 in Latvian football